The Castor River is a river in eastern Ontario, in Canada. It flows into the South Nation River near Casselman. It has a number of branches, including the North, Middle, South and East Castor Rivers which join in Embrun. The river was named for the many beaver dams found in its watershed; "castor" means "beaver" in French.

Communities
Russell
Embrun
Forest Park
Kenmore

See also  
List of rivers of Ontario

Rivers of Ottawa
Tributaries of the South Nation River